King Khalid International Airport is located  north of Riyadh, Saudi Arabia, designed by the architectural firm HOK, and Arabian Bechtel Company Limited served as the construction manager on behalf of the Saudi government.

Formerly the largest airport in the world in terms of ground area, the land area allocated for KKIA is the second-largest in the world, after King Fahd International Airport. The airport is managed and operated by Riyadh Airports Company. The Royal Mosque was designed with a significant programme of integral art; the stained glass, by British architectural artist Brian Clarke, was a landmark work in the history of the medium, considered to be the largest and technically most advanced stained glass project of the modern period.

History
King Khalid International Airport (KKIA), designed by architectural practice Hellmuth, Obata & Kassabaum, was opened by HRH King Fahd on 16 November 1983, and opened for scheduled flights on 5 December of the same year. Until then, what is now Riyadh Air Base served commercial flights to and from Riyadh. Increased international and local air transport requirements for Riyadh made the change necessary. Riyadh Air Base, which is much closer to the city center, is operated by the Royal Saudi Air Force.

This airport was an alternative landing site for NASA's Space Shuttle.

Structure and facilities

Terminals

Passenger terminals

There are five main passenger terminals at the airport, four of them were built when the airport started operation in 1983, and terminal 5 was opened in 2016.
 Terminal 1 is used for all international flights (except those operated by Saudia and Middle East Airlines, which are Skyteam members and Flynas).
 Terminal 2 is used by all international flights for SkyTeam members, including Saudia, and Flynas.
 Terminal 3 has been reopened following its re-development, it currently hosts all "Matchday Shuttle" flights to/from Doha for the FIFA World Cup, the airlines currently using Terminal 3 are as follows, Saudia, Flynas, Flyadeal and Qatar Airways
Terminal 4 has been redeveloped and is now operational. It currently hosts Saudia's non "Matchday Shuttle" flights to/from Doha whilst the FIFA World Cup is ongoing 
 Terminal 5 is the newest terminal opened in 2016, which is now used by Saudia and Flynas for domestic flights.

Terminal 1 to 4 were built when the airport was opened in November, 1983. Each terminal is triangular in plan, with a base of  area. The complex includes a modern VIPs terminal plus restaurants, cafeterias, airlines offices, government departments, hotels and rent-a-car companies counters, banks, first aid clinics and commercial shops.

Terminal 5 is a  rectangular building which can serve 16 narrow-body or 8 wide-body aircraft. Operated by Irish airport operator Dublin Airport Authority, it is Saudi's first privately run airport terminal and can handle 12 million passengers per year.

The Royal Terminal

Heads of state and other high-ranking VIP visitors to the kingdom are greeted in the Royal Pavilion. The Royal Pavilion has open spaces, garden areas, and fountains. The design and geometry of the building are similar to those of the other terminals architecturally and in the aesthetic respect. Arriving guests can use either air bridges or escalators to enter the building from the aircraft parking area. The ceremonial area on the airside has space for special receptions involving honor guards and bands. Glass walls and windows illuminate the interior of the building.

General aviation terminal
A general aviation complex has been constructed north of runway number 1 for use by private aircraft and is reached by a special access road which runs north from the airport access highway. The general aviation facility includes a passenger terminal, aircraft parking and maintenance facilities, taxiways and parking for visitors, tenants and staff. In addition to privately owned aircraft, this facility accommodates Saudia's special flight services group. It's also home to Alsalam Aircraft Company, Ltd. Programmed Depot Maintenance (PDM) on Royal Saudi Air Force aircraft is performed at the uniquely designed facility.

Expansion

In July 2014, German construction company Hochtief won the bid for the airport expansion which aims at increasing its capacity from 15 million to 25 million and includes construction of a new fifth terminal. The contract was valued at €1.3 billion and will be carried out by Hochtief with a 55% stake, along with Indian engineering company Shapoorji Pallonji Mideast and Saudi Arabian construction company Nahdat Al Emaar. Construction is expected to be completed by May 2019. Terminal 4 is expected to be equipped with required facilities. KKIA has not witnessed any development since its establishment in 1983.

The airport will be linked with the city's new metro system, and the GACA has reached an agreement with Riyadh Development Authority for the purpose. The metro system will help passengers reach the city center quickly and comfortably, adding that spots have been allocated in the project for the metro lines. Saudi Railway Company will construct the main railway station on the southeastern part of the airport to be linked with the terminal through the metro system.

King Salman International Airport
King Salman International Airport is a proposed new airport to be built over King Khalid International Airport. The new airport will have no fewer than six parallel runways and capacity for 185 million passengers annually by 2050.

The Royal Mosque

The Royal Mosque is set within a plaza in a central position in the airport. KKIA was the first airport in Saudi Arabia to be built to then-contemporary engineering standards and the mosque was at the time of its construction the most modern mosque in the world, notable for its use of advances in construction and engineering to create a modern complex in a vernacular Arabic style, and for its programme of integral art, at that time the largest in the world, marrying traditional Islamic decorative elements with, and interpreted through, the work of contemporary artists. Hexagonal in plan, and enclosing an area of over 60,000 sq ft, its scale, location and design make it the most dominant building in the passenger complex. The mosque can accommodate 5,000 worshippers inside, with capacity for an additional 4,000 in the surrounding plaza. The mosque's dome,  in diameter and internally clad in polished bronze, is internally separated from the lower roof of the building by a seven-foot clerestory ring of stained glass windows, below which runs a calligraphic mosaic band designed by Iranian-Armenian painter Edman Ayvazyan. The hand-cut glass and marble mosaic, measuring 250 sq metres and fabricated with Clarke's assistance, was the largest in the world at the time,. At the time of its construction, the programme of decorative and integral art for the mosque constituted one of the largest single art projects of the period. A spiral stairway inside the minaret provides access to loudspeakers that broadcast the prayer calls five times daily. A Koranic library off of the main mosque floor has  of user space and the same amount for storage space. The library, private offices and lavatories are located along the southeast on the southwest walls.

Stained glass
In 1982, through the Vesti Corporation, the British architectural artist Brian Clarke was commissioned to conceive of a scheme of stained glass artworks for the interior of the Royal Mosque. Clarke made a study of Islamic ornament at the Quran schools in Fez and Tangiers for six weeks, and produced a series of abstract designs that engaged with historical pan-Islamic decorative tradition. Completed in 1982 and containing 2,000 square metres of stained glass, the Royal Mosque was considered to be the largest and technically most advanced stained glass project of the modern period, requiring the full staff of 4 stained glass factories and 150 craftsmen, taking a year to fabricate. The technical demands of the designs required the revival of certain traditional manufacturing techniques, the development of new ones to accommodate the programme of ornate geometric leading, and the deployment of modern technologies and materials, including screenprinting and the acid-etching of float glass.

Runways and aprons

Air traffic control tower

Twr Freq. 118.6E & 118.8W. GND 121.6. CD 121.8. Riyadh Dept. 120.0 Riyadh Approach 126.0

Six of the 19 floors are considered main floors. These include the operational level at the base of the tower, two equipment floors, an observation floor, a service floor and the cab floor at the top of the tower from which the air traffic controllers overlook the entire airport. The operations floor houses the radar control center for the airport as well as conference rooms, offices and a training area. The two equipment level contain mechanical and electrical equipment and cables, and the service floor contains a kitchen, lounge and lavatories for personnel on duty in the cab. The cab itself contains controller operating positions and electronic and communications equipment. The tower is supplied with two sources of standby power should the regular source of power be interrupted. Once source is the standby power supply at the central power plant – three diesel engine generators. In addition, a 300-kilowatt diesel engine located in the tower itself can provide a secondary source of emergency power. The tower is outfitted with the most advanced electronic radar systems and data processing equipment available.

Inter-terminal connectivity
Passengers going from one terminal to another at King Khalid International Airport can utilize moving sidewalks for transportation. The moving walkways, the first to be installed at any Saudi airport, are located in the three link buildings that connect the international and domestic terminals.

Additional passenger conveniences in the terminal complex include 80 elevators and escalators. In the parking garages, 16 escalators are provided, and two serve the mosque.

The elevators, escalators and moving walkways all have the latest safety equipment installed. Should a fire occur, the elevators would automatically be recalled to the main floors and the doors opened. The escalators and moving sidewalks are equipped with fire and smoke detectors which will cause them to stop automatically should a fire be detected.

Airbridges

KKIA was the first airport in the Kingdom to install airbridges, to speed up handling and turnaround times. Each terminal has eight gates with airbridges effectively eliminating the need for bus journeys between the terminal buildings and waiting aircraft.

Landscaping
Over 225,000 trees, vines, shrubs and ground cover plants were used to landscape the airport site and the interior courtyards. A factor in the landscape design was the limited availability of irrigation water. All of the plants selected for the site are tolerant of heat, wind and dry soil conditions. Wherever possible, plants with a history of successful growth in the Riyadh area or similar environments were selected.

Safety
This facility has five separate fire houses, with several modern firefighting vehicles, and trained firefighters. The location also has security equipment and a security force.

Parking facilities
Two large three-level garages have been constructed directly in front of the passenger terminals, one on either side of the airport mosque. They are connected to the terminals and to the mosque by pedestrian walkways under the arrivals level roadway. The design capacity of the garages is 11,600 vehicles. Escalators and elevators are available in these garages, as well as stairways between the different levels.

Airlines and destinations

Passenger

Cargo

Traffic statistics

Accidents and incidents
 On 27 July 2010 at 11:38 local time, Lufthansa Cargo Flight 8460, an MD-11 registered D-ALCQ, crashed upon landing at the airport and was damaged beyond repair in the ensuing fire. The Pilot in command and the First Officer – the only two persons on board – were injured.

See also
 List of things named after Saudi kings
 Saudia
 King Abdulaziz International Airport

References

External links

 King Khalid International Airport Riyadh
 
 
 

1983 establishments in Saudi Arabia
Airports established in 1983
Airports in Saudi Arabia
Transport in Riyadh
Space Shuttle Emergency Landing Sites